Illinois Central Railroad Depot, and variations, may refer to:

Illinois

 Amboy Illinois Central Depot, Amboy, Illinois, listed on the National Register of Historic Places (NRHP)
 Illinois Central Railroad Passenger Depot (Carbondale, Illinois), listed on the NRHP in Jackson County, Illinois
 Illinois Central Railroad and Toledo, Peoria, and Western Railroad Freight House, El Paso, Illinois, listed on the NRHP in Illinois
 Illinois Central Railroad Depot (Kankakee, Illinois), NRHP-listed
 Illinois Central Railroad Water Tower and Pump House, Kinmundy, Illinois, NRHP-listed
 Illinois Central Railroad Depot (Mattoon, Illinois), NRHP-listed
 Illinois Central Railroad Depot (Ullin, Illinois), NRHP-listed

Indiana

 Illinois Central Railroad Freight Depot (Bloomington, Indiana), listed on the NRHP in Monroe County, Indiana

Iowa

 Ackley Combination Depot, listed on the NRHP in Hardin County, Iowa
 Alta Depot
 Aurelia Depot
 Cherokee Depot and Yard, listed on the NRHP in Iowa
 Cleghorn Depot
 Denison Depot
 Gaza Depot
 George Depot
 Independence Depot
 Iowa Falls Depot
 Manchester Depot
 Meriden Depot
 Osage Depot
 Parkersburg Depot
 Pomeroy Depot
 Primghar Depot
 Rock Rapids Depot
 St. Ansgar Depot
 Sioux City Depot
 Storm Lake Passenger Depot, listed on the NRHP in Iowa
 Ticonic Depot
 Waverly Depot
 Webster City Depot
 Woodbine Depot

Kentucky

Illinois Central Railroad Station and Freight Depot (Bardwell, Kentucky), listed on the NRHP in Kentucky

Minnesota

 Steen Depot

Mississippi

 Illinois Central Railroad Depot (Brookhaven, Mississippi) Brookhaven, Mississippi
 Delta Blues Museum, former station in Clarksdale, Mississippi, listed on the NRHP in Mississippi, alternatively known as Illinois Central Passenger Depot
 Illinois Central Depot (Grenada, Mississippi), listed on the NRHP in Grenada County, Mississippi
 Illinois Central Railroad Passenger Depot (Hazlehurst, Mississippi), listed on the NRHP in Copiah County, Mississippi
 Illinois Central Railroad Freight Depot (Natchez, Mississippi), a Mississippi Landmark
 Illinois Central Railroad Depot (Raymond, Mississippi), listed on the NRHP in Hinds County, Mississippi
 Illinois Central Railroad Depot (Terry, Mississippi), listed on the NRHP in Hinds County, Mississippi

South Dakota

 Illinois Central Passenger Depot (Sioux Falls, South Dakota), listed on the NRHP in Minnehaha County, South Dakota

Tennessee

 Illinois Central Railroad Division Office, Jackson, Tennessee, listed on the NRHP in Madison County, Tennessee
 Newbern Illinois Central Depot, Newbern, Tennessee, NRHP-listed

Wisconsin

 Argyle Depot
 Basco Depot
 Belleville Depot
 Dodgeville Depot
 Madison Freighthouse
 Martintown Depot
 Monroe Freighthouse